The 1900 United States presidential election in Rhode Island took place on November 6, 1900 as part of the 1900 United States presidential election. Voters chose four representatives, or electors to the Electoral College, who voted for president and vice president.

Rhode Island overwhelmingly voted for the Republican nominee, President William McKinley, over the Democratic nominee, former U.S. Representative and 1896 Democratic presidential nominee William Jennings Bryan. McKinley won Rhode Island by a margin of 24.7% in this rematch of the 1896 presidential election. The return of economic prosperity and recent victory in the Spanish–American War helped McKinley to score a decisive victory.

Results

See also
 United States presidential elections in Rhode Island

References

Rhode Island
1900
1900 Rhode Island elections